Beechwood House may refer to:

 Beechwood House, Highgate, London, England
 Beechwood House, Newport, Wales
 Beechwood House, Edinburgh, Scotland, former home of Alexander Asher